The Cardiff Comedy Festival is organised by Scott Fitzgerald, Tom Wakeham, Richard Balshaw, Johnny Disco and Matt Price. As well as showcasing established, mainly Welsh, acts, the Festival also aims to nurture new talent, and in 2010 premiered the first Welsh Unsigned Standup Awards.

2009 Festival
The 2009 Festival ran from 21–26 July 2009, and was based entirely at O'Neill's bar. The heart of the festival was 10 Edinburgh preview shows. Featured artistes included
 Rhod Gilbert with support from Ellis James and James Gordillo
 Sketch troupe The Plastic Seat Company
 Matt Price
 Nick Page
 Wil Hodgson
 Pat Monahan
 Craig Campbell

2010 Festival
Although previous attempts to launch a comedy festival in Cardiff had failed, and promoters had in the past lost money on the venture, the 2009 Festival was sufficiently successful for the organisers to stage a larger event in 2010.

The 2010 Festival ran from the 16–26 July. The line up included
 Rhod Gilbert
 Lucy Porter
 Lloyd Langford
 Matt Price
 Russell Kane
 Jo Caulfield
 Pappy's
 Phil Nichol

In addition to the main festival, there is also the WUSA (Welsh Unsigned Standup Award)  and a series of workshops in Cardiff Central Library.

Venues included St David's Hall, The Glee Club, Central Library, Nos Da and O'Neill's bar.

2011 Festival

Venues included include St David's Hall, The Glee Club, Nos Da (WUSA) and RWCMD

Acts included
Craig Campbell,  Johnny Disco, Taylor Glenn,  Ardal O'Hanlon, Richard Herring,  Ellis James, Wes Packer, Matt Price and JJ Whitehead

2012 Festival
Acts Included Lucy Porter, Vikki Stone, Matt Price, Richard Herring, Ellis James, Lloyd Langford and Wil Hodgeson

Venues included St David's Hall, The Glee Club, Central Library, Chapter Arts Centre and Gwdihw.

References

External links
 Cardiff Comedy
 Official Cardiff Festival website

Comedy festivals in Wales
Festivals in Cardiff